Job Boretsky (secular name Ivan Matfeyevich Boretsky, died 2 March 1631) was the Metropolitan of Kiev, Galicia and all Ruthenia in the Ecumenical Patriarchate of Constantinople in the Eastern Orthodox Church from 1620 to 1631. He was a Ruthenian national, born in Bircza, Ruthenian Voivodeship in the Polish–Lithuanian Commonwealth at an unknown date. He died in the city of Kyiv in the Cossack Hetmanate. As Metropolitan of Kiev, Galicia and all Rus' he was known as an outstanding church leader, educator, and defender of the Eastern Orthodox faith.

Biography 
His family came from Bircha (Bircza) in Galicia (today in Poland). He was educated at the Lviv Dormition Brotherhood School and abroad. He worked as a teacher and rector at the Lviv Dormition Brotherhood School (1604–5) and was the first rector of the Kyiv Epiphany Brotherhood School (1615–18). In 1619, he became hegumen of St. Michael's Golden-Domed Monastery of Kyiv.

In August 1620 the patriarch of Jerusalem, Theophanes III, ordained Boretsky metropolitan of Kyiv, Halychyna, and All-Rus'. Boretsky had a strong influence on the Cossacks under Petro Konashevych-Sahaidachny's hetmancy. As, metropolitan Boretsky composed a petition in defense of the Orthodox hierarchy entitled Protestacja (1621). Along with the Greek-Catholic Metropolitan bishop of Kyiv Josyf Veliamyn Rutsky, he favoured a general reconciliation within the Ukrainian church, but failed to gain the support of the Cossacks for his plans. A prolific translator, Boretsky also wrote poems honouring saints, petitions, prefaces, and edicts. "Perestoroha" is attributed to him. He was the co-author of "Apolleia Apolohii" (A Refutation of 'A Defense,' 1628) and the translator of "Antolohion" from the Greek (1619).

Notelist

References 
 Boretsky, Yov at the Encyclopedia of Ukraine

Metropolitans of Kiev, Galicia and all Rus' (1620-1686)
1631 deaths
Year of birth unknown
People from Przemyśl County
People from Ruthenian Voivodeship
Hegumens
Constantinople Exarchs of Ukraine
Eastern Orthodox monks from Ukraine